Laylā bint Abī Murrah ibn ʿUrwah ibn Masʿūd al-Thaqafī, also known as Umm Laylā, was a wife of Husayn ibn Ali and the mother of Ali al-Akbar and Fatima al-Sughra. She was the niece of Mu'awiya ibn Abi Sufyan. Her grandfather Urwah ibn Mas'ud was considered by Muhammad as one of the four chiefs of Islam.

References

Battle of Karbala
7th-century Arabs
Wives of Shiite Imams
Wives of Husayn ibn Ali
History of Islam